Azorhizobium caulinodans is a species of bacteria that forms a nitrogen-fixing symbiosis with plants of the genus Sesbania. The symbiotic relationship between Sesbania rostrata and A. caulinodans lead to nitrogen fixing nodules in S. rostrata. Bacterial chemotaxis plays an important role in establishing this symbiotic relationship.

Azorhizobium caulinodans is a genome and it contains chemotaxis gene clusters that are unique. It has five chemotaxis genes which are: cheW(1), cheW, cheA, cheR, and cheB. Azorhizobium caulinodans controls the movements of flagella, and the chemotaxis signaling path in Azorhizobium caulinodans helps with regulating biofilm formation.

References

External links
Type strain of Azorhizobium caulinodans at BacDive -  the Bacterial Diversity Metadatabase

Hyphomicrobiales
Bacteria described in 1988